The Church of St Peter and St Paul, Belton, South Kesteven, Lincolnshire is a functioning parish church and a Grade I listed building. Since the 17th century, the church has served as the estate church for Belton House and it holds a notable collection of funerary monuments commemorating members of the Brownlow family.

History
The church dates from around 1200, with later elements dating from the 14th century. From the mid-17th century, the church became closely associated with the Brownlow family of Belton House, which stands to the immediate south of the church. Although the house had its own chapel, the church became the resting place for generations of the family and in the early 19th century Jeffry Wyattville was commissioned to construct a mausoleum. The church holds a large collection of funerary monuments commemorating members of the Brownlow family, covering a period of nearly 400 years.

St Peter and St Paul's remains an active church in the ecclesiastical parish of Belton, in the Deanery of Loveden, and the Diocese of Lincoln. In 2021 the church secured funding from the National Lottery Heritage Fund, and from its own fundraising activities, to enable the restoration of its set of five bells.

Architecture and description
The oldest part of the church is the 12th century tower. The building was extended in the 14th century, and again in the 18th, and then subject to considerable reconstruction and restoration, including the Brownlow mortuary chapel by Jeffry Wyattville in the 19th. Nicholas Antram, in his 2002 revised Lincolnshire in the Pevsner Buildings of England series, describes the church as "badly over-restored" and "brimfull of Brownlow and Cust monuments". 

The monuments to the Brownlows and Custs were often undertaken by the leading artists of the time, and include examples of work by William Stanton, Antonio Canova, Sir Henry Cheere, John Bacon the Elder, William Theed the Younger, Sir Richard Westmacott, Carlo Marochetti and Nina Cust. The churchyard contains the chest tomb of Adelbert Cust, 5th Baron Brownlow, designed by Sir Edwin Lutyens.

St Peter and St Paul's is a Grade I listed building.

Gallery

Footnotes

References

Sources

External links

Grade I listed churches in Lincolnshire
Church of England church buildings in Lincolnshire
English Gothic architecture in Lincolnshire
South Kesteven District